Seasin's Greetinks! is a Popeye theatrical Christmas-themed cartoon short, starring William "Billy" Costello as Popeye and Bonnie Poe as Olive Oyl and William Pennell as Bluto. It was released in 1933 on 17 December and was a cartoon in the Popeye the Sailor series of theatrical cartoons released by Paramount Pictures.

Plot
Popeye gives Olive a pair of ice skates as a Christmas present and teaches her how to skate, but Bluto interrupts the lesson to show how his affection to her, but she gives him the cold shoulder. He starts to cut the ice and she floats on the broken pieces on the running river and calls Popeye for help. As Bluto keeps punching Popeye to keep him from saving her, Olive sees a waterfall and calls for help again. Popeye punches Bluto in and out of the water in an ice cube and sends him to the ice box in the nearest town. He rushes to save Olive, but soon falls down the waterfall and climbs back to save her. As he revives her, Bluto rolls a big snowball to destroy them, but his plan backfires and he rolls down the hill with it. Popeye uses his spinach, hits the snow out of Bluto to make it fall, hits him again, and stars appear out of him which decorate a Christmas tree. Popeye says "Season's Greetings to you all!" and the screen fade to black.

Notes
Seasin's Greetinks! is the fourth Popeye cartoon, and it is also part of one of the few Popeye Christmas and New Year Cartoons produced by Paramount Pictures for King Features Entertainment. Other Popeye Christmas and New Year cartoons released by Paramount Pictures and King Features Syndicate TV included: Let's Celebrake (1938 theatrical short) (produced by Fleischer Studios), Mister and Mistletoe (1955 theatrical short) and Spinach Greetings (1961 Popeye episode), both produced by Paramount Cartoon Studios.

This cartoon is available on DVD in the four-disc set Popeye the Sailor: 1933-1938, Volume 1.

The "pain stars decorate a Christmas tree" gag was later recycled for the end of the Famous short Mister and Mistletoe. 

This short was aired as part of the MeTV Christmas special titled "MeTV's Super Colossal Cartoon Christmas" that was hosted by characters from Toon In with Me and Svengoolie.

See also
 List of Christmas films

References

External links 

1933 films
1933 animated films
American Christmas films
Popeye the Sailor theatrical cartoons
1930s American animated films
1930s Christmas films
American black-and-white films
Paramount Pictures short films
Fleischer Studios short films
Short films directed by Dave Fleischer